The literal meaning of the Greek word  (koinḗ) is "common". It may refer to:

 Koine Greek, the "common" dialect of Greek used in Hellenistic and Roman antiquity
 Koiné language, a supra-regional form of any language
 Standard Modern Greek, sometimes called "modern Koiné"
 The Yoruba language, also called Standard Yoruba